Tarek Ayad (born 29 May 1984) is an Egyptian foil fencer, African champion in 2010. At the 2012 Summer Olympics he competed in the individual event, but was defeated in the table of 32 by Russia's Aleksey Cheremisinov.  He originally took up fencing in 1993, after being encouraged by his brother's friend.  He competed at the 2016 Olympics, losing to eventual champion Daniele Garozzo in the last 32.  He has also won silver and bronze medals at World Cup events.

References

Egyptian male foil fencers
Living people
Olympic fencers of Egypt
Fencers at the 2012 Summer Olympics
Sportspeople from Alexandria
Fencers at the 2016 Summer Olympics
20th-century Egyptian people
21st-century Egyptian people
1984 births